Pickstock Lake FC is a Belizean football team which currently competes in the Belize Premier Football League (BPFL) of the Football Federation of Belize.

The team is based in Belize City.  Their home stadium is MCC Grounds.

Football clubs in Belize
2006 establishments in Belize
Association football clubs established in 2006